Noel Denholm Davis (1876-1950) was an English artist, who worked chiefly as a portrait painter.

He was born in Nottingham, England, in 1876 and studied at Nottingham School of Art, and then the Royal Academy Schools. He spent a decade working in London, before returning to live in Nottingham.

A number of his subjects have connections with Nottingham, including several owned by the University of Nottingham, Nottingham Castle Museum, and Nottingham City Museums and Galleries. One of his portraits of Jesse Boot, 1st Baron Trent is in the collection of the University of Nottingham, another of the same subject is on loan to the National Portrait Gallery. Among his other notable subjects were Albert Ball V.C. and William Booth, founder of the Salvation Army.

In 1929, Davis painted the frescoes, still extant, in the stairwell of Nottingham Council House.

He died at Goring-on-Thames, Oxfordshire, in 1950.

References

External links 

 

1876 births
1950 deaths
English portrait painters
Artists from Nottingham
Alumni of Nottingham School of Art
Fresco painters
Alumni of the Royal Academy Schools
20th-century English painters
English male painters
20th-century English male artists